Andreyevka is a rural locality (a selo) in Lykovskoye Rural Settlement, Podgorensky District, Voronezh Oblast, Russia. The population was 291 as of 2010. There are 6 streets.

Geography 
Andreyevka is located 18 km northeast of Podgorensky (the district's administrative centre) by road. Dolzhik is the nearest rural locality.

References 

Rural localities in Podgorensky District